The 1977 New Zealand Grand Prix was a race held at the Pukekohe Park Raceway on 9 January 1977.  The race had 20 starters.

It was the 23rd New Zealand Grand Prix, and saw the race run with Formula Pacific cars rather than Formula 5000 as was run for the previous few years. The race was won by future Formula One World Champion Keke Rosberg in the Chevron B24. The rest of the podium was completed by American Tom Gloy and Jamaican Richard Melville.

Classification

References

Grand Prix
New Zealand Grand Prix
January 1977 sports events in New Zealand